Perry Johnson (born March 23, 1977) is a Canadian professional ice hockey defencemen. He has played for the Manchester Storm, Kansas City Blades and Rødovre Mighty Bulls professionally as well as several years in amateur hockey with the Canadian National Team and the University of Alberta.

Playing career
Raised in Edmonton, Alberta, Johnson played junior hockey with the Regina Pats for four seasons from 1993–94 until 1997–98 when he joined the Spokane Chiefs in time for their hosting of the 1998 Memorial Cup championship. In 1994–95, Johnson played two games for the Canadian National Team and he joined the team in 1998–99, playing two seasons, with a professional tryout with the Kansas City Blades. In 2000, he played professional hockey in Europe with the Manchester Storm. In 2002, Johnson returned to Alberta, entering the University of Alberta, playing hockey for the university in the CIS. He won two national championships with the U of A in 2005 and 2006. After his years at Alberta, he played the 2006–07 season in Europe with the Storhamar Dragons in Norway. He has played the last two years (2007–08 and 2008–09) in Europe with the Rødovre Mighty Bulls in Denmark.

References

External links

1977 births
Living people
Alberta Golden Bears ice hockey players
Canadian expatriate ice hockey players in Denmark
Canadian expatriate ice hockey players in England
Canadian expatriate ice hockey players in Norway
Canadian expatriate ice hockey players in the United States
Canadian ice hockey defencemen
Kansas City Blades players
Manchester Storm (1995–2002) players
Regina Pats players
Rødovre Mighty Bulls players
Ice hockey people from Edmonton
Spokane Chiefs players
Storhamar Dragons players